Lazar Stankov is an Australian psychologist and emeritus professor of psychology at the University of Sydney, where he taught for over thirty years. Currently, he is a professor at the Institute for Positive Psychology & Education at Australian Catholic University. He received his BA from the University of Belgrade and his PhD from the University of Denver. He is known for his research on intelligence, including studies on the link between political ideology and intelligence, the existence of emotional intelligence, and the psychology of terrorism.

References

External links
Faculty page

Australian psychologists
Living people
Academic staff of the Australian Catholic University
Academic staff of the University of Sydney
Psychometricians
University of Belgrade alumni
University of Denver alumni
Year of birth missing (living people)